Grandadbob are Vanessa Robinson and Dave Johnson, from Sheffield, UK. Their music consists of electronic house, pop and trip hop. The name Grandadbob comes from Vanessa's grandfather, Robert Porter, who pronounces himself at the end of the track "Monster" on Waltzes for Weirdoes as "The real Grandad Bob". They recorded a radio session for Sheffield's Radio2XS in 2004.

Discography
Waltzes for Weirdoes (2003)
Garden of Happiness (2006)

External links
 Grandadbob on Myspace

Electronic music duos